Janikowo  is a village in the administrative district of Gmina Górowo Iławeckie, within Bartoszyce County, Warmian-Masurian Voivodeship, in northern Poland, close to the border with the Kaliningrad Oblast of Russia.

Population 

1933: 462
1939: 457
2008: 540

References

Janikowo